Timothy Richard Downie (born 14 July 1977) is an English actor and writer. He is known for the television series Toast of London, Outlander and Upstart Crow, and the films Paddington and The King's Speech. Downie was born in Hitchin, Hertfordshire. Before starting his professional career, he trained at the Mountview Academy of Theatre Arts.

Career

Television
Downie's first television appearance was in 1994 in an episode of ITV's  police drama The Bill, followed by a guest spot on the series two premiere of ITV's comedy Conjugal Rites. In 1996 he joined the cast of CBBC's Out of Tune, a children's sitcom which focused on the lives of the member of a church choir, alongside James Corden and Jane Danson. He would go on to appear on BBC One's teenage game show To Me... To You... in 1998 before landing the role of Sam Smallwood in a seven episode stint on Channel 4's soap opera Hollyoaks. Next he would guest star in an episode of BBC One's courtroom drama Judge John Deed (2001) as Constable Hoskins.

In 2002, Downie joined the cast of BBC's series Doctors, portraying Alex North in 112 episodes of the drama. 2004 saw him guest star on Fox Network's action/comedy Keen Eddie, which centered on an NYPD officer stationed in London, and the BBC's crime procedural New Tricks, which followed an Unsolved Crime and Open Case Squad (UCOS) of London's Metropolitan Police Service. From there he would guest star on CBBC's teenage drama M.I.High in the series two finale titled "Asteroid Attack" (2008) and BBC's sitcom The Legend of Dick and Dom in a series one episode titled "The Tears of Fury". In 2009, Downie co-starred in BBC Four's Micro Men, a comedic account of the rivalry between 1980's British computer giants Sir Clive Sinclair and Chris Curry, opposite Martin Freeman and Alexander Armstrong. For the next two years, between 2010 and 2011, Downie would star with fellow actor Sam Heughan in a series of television commercials as part of an ad campaign for Tennents Lager in the UK.

Beginning in 2011, Tim appeared as Yates, opposite David Jason, in the BBC comedy series The Royal Bodyguard, which followed the misadventures of a clumsy officer who was appointed as the Queen's new bodyguard. That same year he was cast in Sky Atlantic's comedy This is Jinsy, the first series of which was nominated for the British Comedy Awards for Best Sketch Show. Downie would also appear in the second series three years later. 2012 would see Downie appear in several television productions. First was the television film The Cricklewood Greats, a spoof documentary of the early British film industry for BBC Four, which saw him star opposite Peter Capaldi. He would next feature in episode one of ITV's mini-series Titanic, which was released to coincide with the one hundredth anniversary of the tragedy. Downie would finish out the year with appearances in Channel 4's mismatched roommate sitcom Peep Show, ITV's anthology series Little Crackers, which featured one-off comedies or dramas revolving around the theme of famous people's Christmas memories, and the first of a three-year stint as Danny Bear on Channel 4's comedy Toast of London.

BBC's comedy Miranda, saw Downie guest star in 2013. From there he went on to appearances in BBC Two's veterinarian sitcom Heading Out, the two-part series seven premiere of E4's hit Skins, a regular role in BBC One's sitcom Father Figure, and an appearance in BBC Two's BAFTA nominated short children's program Found. In 2015 Tim made a cameo appearance in Dave TV's mockumentary series Hoff the Record, which was loosely based upon the life of actor David Hasslehoff. That same year he would appear in an episode of ITV's mini-series Jekyll and Hyde and episode three of E4's science fiction comedy series Tripped.

Downie would begin 2016 with a role in series three of ITV Two's sitcom Plebs, which followed the adventures of three men living in Rome. He would go on to appeare in the made-for-television film Young Hyacinth, a prequel to BBC One's sitcom Keeping Up Appearances, an episode of Channel 4's online short video vehicle Comedy Blaps entitled Filcher & Crook, several episodes of Comedy Central's Drunk History: UK, and a regular role as Christoper (Kit) Marlowe in Ben Elton's ongoing sitcom Upstart Crow. The next year, Downie featured in an episode of BBC's comedy Count Arthur Strong, opposite comedian and writer Steve Delaney, an episode of E4's comedy of innocence Chewing Gum, and an episode of Comedy Central's sitcom I Live with Models.

2018 saw Downie cast as recurring character, and real-life historical figure, Governor William Tryon in STARZ's television adaptation of Diana Gabaldon's best selling Scottish time travel novel Outlander. Downie went on to executive produce and star in the six part-comedy The Jewish Enquirer, alongside Lucy Montgomery, in early 2020. Later that year he appeared in creators Justin Sbresni and Mark Bussell's YouTube series Housebound, which focused on ordinary life in the era of COVID-19 lockdown.

In January 2022 Downie joined the cast of Amazon and the BBC's Good Omens for its second series, currently in production.

Film
Downie's first professional film role was in 2002's mystery thriller Dead Man's Dream, from directors Abner Pastoll and Kamma Pastoll. Two years later he would star in director Emory Ruegg's short film Swiss Passport, which was created for the Straight 8 Competition at 2004's Soho Rushes Film Festival. That same year he would appear in the drama Shooting Shona opposite Samantha Béart. In 2008, Downie would once again work with director Abner Pastoll on his short film Homicide: Division B, a dramatic comedy about the British police, before starring in the direct-to-video horror film The Gatekeeper.

In 2010, Downie appeared as H.G. Wells in the short film A Great Mistake, which screened at Cannes Film Festival's Short Film Corner and the Shanghai International Film Festival.  That same year he would feature as the Duke of Gloucester in the Academy Award winning film The King's Speech. The next year he portrayed Danny in Michael Tchoubouroff's dramatic comedy Diagnosis Superstar. He would go on, in 2012, to feature in the musical Les Misérables, opposite Eddie Redmayne and Aaron Tveit. Two years later Downie would appear as explorer Montgomery Clyde in the family film Paddington, which was based upon author Michael Bond's series of children's books.

2017 Downie appeared in three feature films. First was the Netflix original War Machine, a film which was inspired by US Army General Stanley McChrystal, opposite Brad Pitt. Second was a cameo in director Michael Bay's Transformers: The Last Knight, the fifth installment in the Transformers franchise. He would finish the year with Vertical Entertainment's hostage thriller 6 Days, which chronicled the siege of the Iranian Embassy in London by militants. The next year he would feature in independent film The Mercy, the true story of Donald Crowhurst (Colin Firth), an amateur sailor who participated in the Sunday Times Golden Globe Race in 1968. He would go on to a supporting role in the comedy I Love My Mum, from Spanish writer and director Albert Sciamma.

It was announced in 2018 that Downiehad been cast in Citrus Film's Horrible Histories: The Movie - Rotten Romans, an adaptation of the best-selling children's historical comedy books from Scholastic. The film is scheduled to be released to UK and Irish theatres in July 2019 and US theatres in November.

Theatre
Downie has appeared in numerous stage productions including writer Peter Maddock's 2007 play Charlie and Henry at the New End Theatre and writer Gavin Davis' 2008 comedy Fat Christ at the King's Head Theatre in London, England. In 2010 he appeared in to different plays at the Birmingham Repretory Theatre, first was Lutz Hübner's German play Respect, followed by Samantha Ellis’s Jewish drama Cling To Me Like Ivy. He also appeared in1966 World Cup Final (2002) on tour around the UK, Pawnography, and Le Jet De Sang at The Rose (theatre) in London 2007, part of their first residency in 500 years. In 2015 he appeared in Hampstead Theatre’s production of writer Michael Frayn's play Matchbox Theatre.

Writing
As a writer, Downie had his first theatre piece, The Dead Moon, commissioned in 2008. The play toured the UK and was also performed at the Aldeburgh Festival, the first non-operatic piece to ever be performed there. In 2009 he was one of two finalists selected in the Heat 2, first round assignments (of 540 entries in 30 heats) in the New York Screenwriters' Challenge for his script The Robin Wins The Spring. Since then his theatre work has included The Curse of Elizabeth Faulkner for 2010's Off Cut Festival in London, which was also performed at the King's Head Theatre, and The Revenge of Anubis. In 2010 Dowie penned The Story Project 2 – Love, Lies and London for The Southwark Playhouse and A Portrait of Maureen Flange for the Etcetera Theatre.

Video games 
In October 22, 2020, Downie revealed on Twitter that he would be doing voice work for the upcoming video game, Baldur's Gate III, playing the wizard, Gale.

Filmography

Film

Television

Theatre

As writer

References

External links
 
 Tim Downie's page at Independent Talent

1977 births
Living people
20th-century English male actors
21st-century English male actors
English male film actors
English writers
English male television actors
Male actors from Hertfordshire
People from Hitchin